En barkbåt till Eddie is a 1992 children's book by Viveca Sundvall. The book is the second in the Eddie series. It is set in western Sweden.

The book was nominated to the August Prize in the category "Swedish children's and youth book of the year".

References

1992 children's books
Rabén & Sjögren books
Works by Viveca Lärn
1992 Swedish novels